Ronald Robson Batty (born 5 October 1925 in Lanchester, County Durham - died 1971) was an English football full-back. He began his career with non-league Stanley United before signing for Newcastle United during the Second World War. He appeared for the club in 161 league games, scoring one goal. He left the club in 1958 to move to Gateshead where he added a further 40 league appearances before retiring. He played at left back in the FA Cup winning Newcastle United team of 1955

Career statistics

References

1925 births
1971 deaths
English footballers
Newcastle United F.C. players
Gateshead A.F.C. players
Gateshead A.F.C. managers
People from Lanchester, County Durham
Footballers from County Durham
Association football defenders
English football managers
FA Cup Final players